The Golden Age of Freethought is the mid 19th-century period in United States history which saw the development of the socio-political movement promoting freethought. Anti-authoritarian and intellectually liberating historical eras had existed many times in history, notably in eighteenth century France. But the period roughly from 1875 to 1914 is referred to by at least one contemporary writer as "the high-water mark of freethought as an influential movement in American society". It began around 1856 and lasted at least through the end of the century; author Susan Jacoby places the end of the Golden Age at the start of World War I.

Freethought is a philosophical position that holds that ideas and opinions should be based on science and reason, and not restricted by authority, tradition, or religion. It is characteristic of the 18th century Enlightenment but hardly confined to any one epoch or place. The late nineteenth century American Golden Age was encouraged by the lectures of the extremely popular agnostic orator Robert Green Ingersoll, the popularization of Charles Darwin's On the Origin of Species, the push for women's suffrage, and other political, scientific, and social trends that clashed with religious orthodoxy and caused people to question the traditional ideas about the world that they encountered in received opinion.

A freethinker of the late 19th century could have been someone from any of the varied religious and political backgrounds. Charles Knowlton, D. M. Bennett, and Ingersoll were influential freethinkers of the period.

Robert G. Ingersoll (1833–1899) was one of the more prominent freethinkers of his time. He was known as the "Great Agnostic". Ingersoll, a lawyer, an orator and a Civil War veteran, is famous for his skeptical approaches to popular religious beliefs. He would speak in public about orthodox views and would often poke fun at them. Guests would pay $1 to hear him speak. A dollar in his day was a hefty sum ($30 in 2020). Ingersoll was the leader of the American Secular Union, successor organization to the National Liberal League.

Charles Knowlton was born into a Puritan household in 1800. The science and medicine practiced around this time was known as "heroic". Heroic medicinal treatment and was rather medieval and consisted of blood-letting, and induced vomiting and profuse sweating. These treatment, far from being restorative, usually actually proved harmful to patients. Knowlton had wet dreams in his adolescence, leading him to be the subject of many types of heroic treatment. The revulsion that these interventions induced in him prompted him to pursue humane approaches to treatment. Believing that effective and healthy treatment must be founded on a sound understanding of human anatomy, he began robbing graves and studying the bodies he exhumed. Knowlton was imprisoned for this. On release his concern for the introduction of more humane medicine was undimmed. He became a doctor, putting his scientific findings into his practice. He also married into a family of freethinkers.

Knowlton wrote "Elements of Modern Materialism" and "Fruits of Philosophy" in 1832. The second would prove much more successful. The book included a spermicidal method which he had invented.

References

External links
 beliefnet.com on the Golden Age of Freethought
 beliefnet.com interview with Susan Jacoby
 The Works of Robert G. Ingersoll, Vol. 1 (of 12) by Robert Green Ingersoll at Gutenberg.org
 Freethought Revival at beliefnet.com
 goldenageoffreethought.com from the Truth Seeker magazine

Freethought in the United States
Freethought
19th century in the United States
Social history of the United States